Powder Horn is the eighth studio album by Shit and Shine, released on 19 August 2014 by Diagonal. The release saw Craig Clouse's continued exploration of the dance and electronic genre he had started with DIAG004. The Vinyl Factory placed the album at number eight on their "Top 100 Vinyl Releases of 2014" list and credited with being one of the best electronic releases of the year.

Track listing

Personnel
Adapted from the Powder Horn liner notes.
Shit and Shine
 Craig Clouse – vocals, instruments
Production and additional personnel
 Matt Colton – mastering
 Guy Featherstone – cover art

Release history

References

External links 
 

2014 albums
Shit and Shine albums